Gangamela is a genus of moths in the subfamily Arctiinae erected by Francis Walker in 1865.

Species
 Gangamela ira Druce, 1896
 Gangamela saturata Walker, 1864

References

Arctiinae